The Van Diemen RF88, and its evolution, the RF89, were open-wheel formula race car chassis, designed, developed and built by British manufacturer and race car constructor Van Diemen, for Formula Ford 1600 race categories, in 1988.

References 

Open wheel racing cars
Formula Ford cars